The 546th Fighter Squadron is a disbanded United States Air Force unit.   Its last assignment was to the 478th Fighter Group at Portland Army Air Base, Oregon, where it was disbanded on 31 March 1944.  During World War II the squadron served as a Bell P-39 Airacobra replacement training unit.

History
The squadron was first activated in late 1943 as the 546th Fighter Squadron (Twin Engine) at Hamilton Field, California.  It was one of the four original squadrons of the 478th Fighter Group, which drew its original cadre from the 328th Fighter Group.

The squadron moved twice in the first two months of its existence, to Santa Rosa Army Air Field in December 1943, then to Madras Army Air Field in February 1944 as its parent group dispersed its component squadrons to separate bases in California, Oregon, and Washington.

The group and squadron experienced delays and were not fully manned or equipped until March 1944, when they began operations as a Replacement Training Unit (RTU) using single engine Bell P-39 Airacobras despite their designation as a two engine units.  RTUs were oversized units whose mission was to train individual pilots or aircrews prior to their deployment to combat theaters.     However, the Army Air Forces found that standard military units, based on relatively inflexible tables of organization were proving less well adapted to the training mission.  Accordingly, a more functional system was adopted in which each base was organized into a separate numbered unit, while the groups and squadrons acting as RTUs were disbanded or inactivated.   The squadron moved to Portland Army Air Base in late March 1944, where it was replaced, along with other units at Portland, by the 432d AAF Base Unit (Fighter Replacement Training Unit, Single Engine), which absorbed its mission, personnel and equipment.

Lineage
 Constituted as the 546th Fighter Squadron (Twin Engine) on 12 October 1943
 Activated on December 1943
 Disbanded on 31 March 1944

Assignments
 478th Fighter Group, 1 December 1943 - 31 March 1944

Stations
 Hamilton Field, California, 1 December 1943
 Santa Rosa Army Air Field, California, 12 December 1943
 Madras Army Air Field, Oregon, 2 February 1944
 Portland Army Air Base, Oregon, 29 March 1944 - 31 March 1944

Aircraft
 Bell P-39 Airacobra, 1944

References

Notes

Bibliography

See also

Fighter squadrons of the United States Army Air Forces
Military units and formations established in 1943
Military units and formations disestablished in 1944